Maurice Benet (born 5 November 1941) is a French racing cyclist. He rode in the 1966 Tour de France.

References

1941 births
Living people
French male cyclists
Place of birth missing (living people)